1,2-Dibromoethylene, also known as 1,2-dibromoethene and acetylene dibromide, is a dihalogenated unsaturated compound with one bromine on each of the two carbon atoms. There are two isomers of this compound, cis and trans. Both isomers are colorless liquids.

Synthesis
1,2-dibromoethylene can be synthesized by halogenation of acetylene CH with bromine Br. In order to prevent the formation tetrahalogenated compounds, acetylene is used in excess, with Br as the limiting reagent.

Alternately, halogenation of this kind could also be achieved through the use of two equivalents of N-bromosuccinimide and lithium bromide (LiBr). N-Bromosuccinimide provides Br as an electrophile, which is followed by Br from LiBr.

References

Organobromides
Alkene derivatives